Si was a Chinese surname during the Xia Dynasty. According to Records of the Grand Historian, the surname of the Xia Dynasty ruler was Si (姒). In general, the Chinese hold Xia founder Yu the Great (禹) to be a descendant of Emperor Yao (堯).  It is one of the traditional description was what were known as the "Eight Great Xings of High Antiquity", along with Jiāng, Jī, Yáo, Yíng, Yún, Guī and Rèn, though some sources quote Jí as the last one instead of Rèn.  Of these xing, only Jiang and Yao have survived in their original form to modern days as frequently occurring surnames. The Song dynasty-era Hundred Family Surnames poem does not have Si. Although it exists in the modern day, only an estimated 2000 people in Mainland China today share the name.

Surnames during the Xia

See also

References

Chinese-language surnames
Xia dynasty

Eight Great Surnames of Chinese Antiquity